Puthiya Mukham is a 2009 Indian Malayalam-language action thriller film  directed by Diphan and written by M. Sindhuraj. The film stars Prithviraj Sukumaran, Bala, Priyamani and Meera Nandan. It was shot at locations in Kochi, Thrissur, Palakkad, and Malaysia. The film's original background score and the soundtrack were composed by Deepak Dev.

The film was a major commercial success at the box office and was noted for heightening the stardom of Prithviraj in the Malayalam film industry. It was dubbed in Tamil with the same name, and was remade in Kannada as Ziddi. This film also has a Telugu dubbed version under the title Yama Mudhuru.

Plot
Krishnakumar aka Kichu is a resident of an agraharam in Kalpathy. Along with his studies, he pursues a career as a percussionist and teaches the mridangam to local students. He is in love with Sreedevi, who is the daughter of Kichu's family friend, and their relationship is supported by both families. Kichu moves to the city of Kochi (Ernakulam) to enroll in an engineering college. Sudhi is a senior student and the youngest of two gangster brothers Mahi and Giri. 

Sudhi pursues a real estate business and crimes associated with it. In all his endeavours on the campus, Sudhi is supported by his brothers. Anjana, SI Shivaraman's daughter joins the engineering college. Sudhi is in love with her, and to win her love, plays the gentleman role, concealing and temporarily stopping all his illegal activities. Kichu wins the heart of everyone in the college. Sudhi suspects that Anjana is attracted to Kichu, so he moves fast and sends his brothers with an official proposal to Anjana's family. They accept the proposal and force the reluctant Anjana to agree. However, she stipulates a condition: there will be no marriage immediately. Sudhi has to wait for four years for the marriage; she will have freedom for these four years. 

The freedom of Anjana and the way she exercises it makes Sudhi jealous and suspicious. Sudhi wants to scare Kichu out of the college. He arranges an attack on him at the college hostel and assaults him; as a result, Kichu is severely wounded and apparently receives a blow on his head, Kichu appears to turn mad and attacks his own friend who tried to rescue him where he is admitted in a hospital and a doctor reveals that Kichu is suffering from a flashback phenomenon. When Kichu was young, he had witnessed the death of his younger brother, who was hit by a bus and traumatic incidents like this will turn him violent. 

Sreedevi's family disapproves of the marriage following this. His own family does not want him to go to college anymore, but his father supports him, urges him to go back and achieve something in life. Kichu comes to college where he thrashes up Sudhi and his friends and warns him. Sudhi's brothers turn in for help. Kichu sends the eldest brother, Mahi, to the hospital, mortally wounded. He is put in the ICU for observation and is reportedly in a coma. Shivaraman  (who is in cahoots with Mahi and Giri) arrests Kichu and takes him to the police station. 

In the station, Kichu learns that he is going to be transported to the sub-jail where his execution is planned. Kichu turns violent and storms the police station. He is hit by a policeman from behind and apparently falls unconscious, but it is only a ruse. He is rushed to the hospital, where he escapes from the police. Sudhi kidnaps Anjana and a final showdown ensues at an abandoned construction site where a heated argument and close-combat ensues which leads to Sudhi's death and Kichu walks away with Anjana, who has now fallen for Kichu.

Cast

Prithviraj Sukumaran as Krishnakumar Aiyyar aka Kicha 
Bala as Sudhi
Priyamani as Anjana Sivaraman
Meera Nandan as Sreedevi
Oviya as Meera
Sudheesh as Varghese
Vishnu Priyan as Venki
Jagathy Sreekumar as Fr. Thekkan
Nedumudi Venu as Menon 
Shobha Mohan as Savithri
Vijayaraghavan as Shivaraman
Sai Kumar as Mahi
Shammi Thilakan as Giri
Jagadish as Harishankar
Sona Nair as Vanaja
Guinness Pakru as Canteen Rajan
Jaffar Idukki as Canteen Suni
Thara Kalyan as Anjana's aunt
 Manka Mahesh as Bharathi, Anjana's mother
Kalaranjini as Mahi's wife
Kalashala Babu as Sreenivasan
Anil Murali as Sandeep, Sreedevi's brother
Seema G. Nair as Sudhi's kin
Chali Pala as Ex-MLA Vishwambaran
Dinesh Panicker as Doctor Shanavas
Surabhi Lakshmi as Rohini
Joy John Antony as Kuruvila

Music 

Puthiya Mukham is the soundtrack album composed by Deepak Dev with song lyrics by Kaithapram Damodaran Namboothiri for the 2009 Malayalam film of the same name. The album features five tracks released on 24 July 2009 by Satyam Audios.

The original background score and film's soundtrack is composed by Deepak Dev with lyrics by Kaithapram Damodaran Namboothiri. It features five songs which were sung by Deepak Dev himself for one song and Shankar Mahadevan, Jassie Gift, Prithviraj, KK, Shilpa Rao, Sindhu Rajaram and Suvi.

Shankar Mahadevan won the Best Singer award for the song "Picha Vecha Naal" at the Annual Malayalam Movie Awards. At the 2009 Asianet Film Awards, Deepak Dev received the Best Music Director Award for his songs in the movie, while Shankar Mahadevan won the Best Male Playback Singer Award for the song "Picha Vecha Naal". "Picha Vecha Naal" (Shankar Mahadevan) and "Thattum Muttum Thalam" (Jassie Gift, Deepak Dev, Sindhuja) were chart toppers on Malayalam television/radio stations.

Box office
Puthiya Mukham received positive reviews from critics and became a commercial success at the box office. The film also heightened Prithviraj to superstardom.

References

External links
 

2009 films
2000s Malayalam-language films
2009 action films
Indian action films
Malayalam films remade in other languages
Films shot in Palakkad
Films shot in Thrissur
Films shot in Kochi
Films shot in Malaysia
Films directed by Diphan